Alexandrovo is a rural locality (a selo) in Golovinskoye Rural Settlement, Sudogodsky District, Vladimir Oblast, Russia. The population was 5 as of 2010.

Geography 
Alexandrovo is located 20 km west of Sudogda (the district's administrative centre) by road. Mordasovo is the nearest rural locality.

References 

Rural localities in Sudogodsky District
Sudogodsky Uyezd